Burton Park SSSI is a  biological Site of Special Scientific Interest west of Pulborough in West Sussex. The site is adjacent to Burton Park, a Grade I listed building.

This site comprises a large pond, carr woodland, bog, wet heath and marshy grassland. There is a diverse range of invertebrates including three nationally rare species, the snail Omphiscola glabra and the craneflies Erioptera meijerei and Tipula marginata. The site is also important for its breeding water birds, such as water rails and great crested grebes.

References

Local Nature Reserves in West Sussex
Sussex Wildlife Trust
Sites of Special Scientific Interest in West Sussex